Ansar Abbasi (born June 12, 1965), is a Pakistani right-wing commentator and columnist associated with The News International.

As one of Pakistan's most prominent journalists, Abbasi generally holds socially conservative and nationalist views. He has been critical of activists including Malala Yousafzai. He has called on a ban on Indian channels and strict checks on culturally offensive content in Pakistani dramas and movies. According to The Huffington Post, Abbasi holds orthodox religious views and rigid anti-American views.

Early life
Abbasi was born in Murree, Pakistan, to a Dhund Abbasi family of that locality. He received his early education in his native village. Abbasi obtained matriculation or finished his basic education from Sir Syed School, Rawalpindi. Later he joined Government College Asghar Mall, where he completed his Intermediate and Bachelor of Arts education. He received his master's degree from Balochistan University, Quetta. He also earned another master's degree from Goldsmiths College, University of London. His research thesis was on child labor. Today, Ansar Abbasi doubtedly stands as a prominent icon in journalism in Pakistan. He has been writing for the English newspapers for a long time. He is the youngest son of Muhammad Sajawal Abbasi (Late) who died in 1981. He belongs to the clan of Abbasis from the beautiful Murree Hills.

Career
It was a planned career move. After doing his master's degree in mass communication, Ansar opted to be a journalist in 1991. He wanted to join the popular Urdu Daily Jang. However, as a matter of what he now regards as good luck, he got his first career appointment with an English Daily: 'The Democrat'. After Masters in Mass Communication, Abbasi began his career as a professional journalist in 1991. His first stint was with an English-language daily, The Democrat. Later, he worked for two months at Pakistan Times newspaper, before eventually joining The News International, of which he is now an editor.
He regards English journalism better than Urdu journalism, as he feels that mostly an Urdu journalist does nothing but dealing with 'Statement Journalism'. His own experience tells him that English journalism in Pakistan gives a journalist more growth opportunities and more chances to learn. He feels good that he landed in English journalism from the very start.

Experiences abroad 
While pursuing his master's degree from the United Kingdom, he learnt a great deal from his school and from the exposure otherwise as well. He believes that he learnt more from travelling and visiting places than what he did from the curriculum at school. He acknowledges the system of education and research over there and finds the standards of labs and libraries really up to the mark. He feels a dire need that the authorities look into the dilapidated state of government universities in Pakistan and to equip them with what the student of today needs. His research thesis there included one on 'Child Labor' and for that particular one he found more than enough data on it, more than what he would have ever dreamt of in any university's library in Pakistan; given that Pakistan is a developing country and faces the menace of child labor to a much more alarming extent as compared to the UK.

Investigative articles

Chief Justice Choudhry

Abbasi was among the first to bring forth allegations against Chief Justice Iftikhar Choudhray for gross misconduct in 2002, accusing him of admitting his son Dr. Arsalan to the Federal Investigation Agency undermining all merits. Primarily based on this allegation the establishment moved a reference to Supreme Judicial Council against Chief Justice Iftikhar Choudhry.

President Musharraf

Abbasi has published work critical of the regime of former president Pervez Musharraf accusing him of building a multi-million rupees residence at Chak Shehzad, equipped with utilities at much cheaper rates with differential subsidized by the government.

He was critical of the former general for removing the Chief Justice of Pakistan Iftikhar Muhammad Choudhry and submitting his case to the Supreme Judicial Council.

Maulana Fazl ur Rahman
In November 2008, Abbasi published a story on the award of acres of military land worth millions of rupees to the family members of the leader of Jamiat Ulema-e-Islam, Maulana Fazl ur Rahman. Abbasi alleged that the regime of the then President General Pervez Musharraf attempted to buy off Maulana's opposition to General Musharraf's assumption of two public offices at a time.

Justice Dogar

"Our Special Daughters", an investigative report by Abbasi in Daily News, found out that Justice Dogar's daughter Farah Hameed Dogar's examination paper for F.Sc. was reassessed in violation of a previous Supreme Court ruling. While the results of 201 candidates were revised, only for her were the examination papers re-marked and the numbers increased. In the other 200 cases, only errors in adding the total marks were corrected. The case later went on to the parliamentary committee for education.

See also 
List of Pakistani journalists
Pakistan Federal Union of Journalists

References

1965 births
Living people
People from Murree
Pakistani male journalists
Pakistani newspaper editors
University of Balochistan alumni
Urdu-language non-fiction writers
Pakistani Islamists
Urdu-language columnists
21st-century Urdu-language writers
Pakistani investigative journalists
Pakistani columnists